Burroughs High School may refer to:
John Burroughs High School in Burbank, California
Sherman E Burroughs High School in Ridgecrest, California
John Burroughs School in Ladue, Missouri